Iramba, also known as Nilamba (there is no distinction between  and ) is a Bantu language of spoken by the Nilamba and Iambi people of the Iramba District in the Singida Region of Tanzania.

Forms of the name occur with and without the prefix ni- or i-, as well as iki- (Swahili ki-) as the noun-class prefix for 'language', and variation of r ~ l ~ ly in the root. This results in many superficial variants, including Nilamba, Niramba, Nilyamba, Nyilamba, Ikinilamba, Ikiniramba, Ilamba, Iramba, Kinilamba, Kiniramba; there is also Nilambari.

The 50,000 Iambi speak a slightly divergent dialect, sometimes listed as a distinct language. On the other hand, the Isanzu language is sometimes included as a dialect.

References

External links
 Nilamba basic lexicon at the Global Lexicostatistical Database

Languages of Tanzania
Northeast Bantu languages